Magnus Backes (17 September 1930 – 21 May 2019) was a German art historian and historic preservationist. From 1983 to 1991, he succeeded Werner Bornheim gen. Schilling and Hartmut Hofrichter as the third  of the General Directorate for Cultural Heritage Rhineland-Palatinate Rheinland-Pfalz in Mainz.

Life

Origin and education 
Born in Cologne, Backes first attended a grammar school in Bonn before taking up studies in history of art and archaeology at the Rheinische Friedrich-Wilhelms-Universität Bonn there. In 1957, he was awarded a Dr. phil. with Heinrich Lützeler for his thesis Julius Ludwig Rothwei, ein rheinisch-hessischer Barockarchitekt and his dissertation was also awarded the Paul Clemen Scholarship.

Career 
Following his studies and doctorate, Backes found employment from 1958 to 1961 as curator at Marksburg, which is owned by the German Castles Association. These years had a lasting influence on his further life, but also on his work as a monument conservator. It was at Marksburg, the only hilltop castle on the Middle Rhine that had remained undestroyed over the centuries, that he met his future wife, whom he married in 1960. His work on this monument "probably decided his career path, to deal directly and practically with the monuments of history and to make them clear to people, to make them understandable and, last but not least, to preserve them for future generations." He subsequently published several times on the Marksburg, some in higher editions.

His most important work from this period is the Hesse edition from the series of  founded by Georg Dehio and continued by Ernst Gall.

Monument conservator 
In 1964, he finally joined the Landesamt für Denkmalpflege Rheinland-Pfalz as a research assistant. Initially an employee, he rose there to conservator and ultimately to senior conservator before moving to the Bayerisches Landesamt für Denkmalpflege in Munich in 1973. As "area consultant, head of department and representative of the general conservator", he not only learned more about Franconian culture, but also about the skills needed to run a department. Experience that would be of use to him after his appointment as the new State Conservator of Rhineland-Palatinate by the then Minister of Culture  on 1 January 1983.

Until 30 June 1991 his office grew to up to 160 employees at times, with simultaneous restructuring towards decentralisation.

The external reputation was just as important to him as the "internal consolidation" and expansion of the office he led. At the level of UNESCO, he represented the Federal Republic of Germany during the talks held in Australia concerning the inclusion of the Speyer Cathedral and the Würzburg Residence (1981) to the World Heritage List.

Backes died in Wiesbaden at the age of 88.

Publications 
 
 Hessen. Dehio-Handbuch, Deutscher Kunstverlag, Berlin 1966 (2nd edition. 1975).
 With Hans Caspary and Norbert Müller-Dietrich: Die Kunstdenkmäler des Rhein-Hunsrück-Kreises. (Sixth volume in two parts), publisher Werner Bornheim gen. Schilling, Deutscher Kunstverlag, Berlin/Munich 1977, .

Further reading 
 Magnus Backes gewidmet: Denkmalpflege in Rheinland-Pfalz. Jahresberichte 1989–1991. Jahrgang 44–46, publisher Landesamt für Denkmalpflege Rheinland-Pfalz, Wernersche Verlagsgesellschaft, Worms 1994, .
 Regine Dölling: Magnus Backes und die Marksburg. In Burgen und Schlösser. Jg. 43, Nr, 2002, .
 Veit Geißler: Dr. Magnus Backes. In Denkmalpflege in Rheinland-Pfalz. Jahresberichte 1989–1991. Jahrgang 44–46, publisher Landesamt für Denkmalpflege Rheinland-Pfalz, Wernersche Verlagsgesellschaft, Worms 1994, . Schriftenverzeichnis .

References

External links 
 
 Nachruf der Generaldirektion Kulturelles Erbe in Rheinland-Pfalz

Historical preservationists
German art historians
1930 births
2019 deaths
People from Cologne